The Maltese alphabet is based on the Latin alphabet with the addition of some letters with diacritic marks and digraphs. It is used to write the Maltese language, which evolved from the otherwise extinct Siculo-Arabic dialect, as a result of 800 years independent development. It contains 30 letters: 24 consonants and 6 vowels (a, e, i, o, u, ie).

There are two types of Maltese consonants:

  (sun consonants): ċ d n r s t x ż z
  (moon consonants): b f ġ g għ h ħ j k l m p q v w

Samples

In the alphabetic sequence c is identical either to k (in front of a, o, u or consonant or as the last letter of the word) or to z (in front of e or i). The letter y is identical to i.

Older versions of the alphabet

Rather than using a c with a cedilla, Panzavecchia used a c with ogonek . It was not until 1866 that  came to be used.

Until the middle of the 19th century, two sounds which would merge into  were differentiated in Maltese. Panzavecchia used a specially designed font with a curly . A Short Grammar of the Maltese Language used  with a superscript Arabic ʿayn to represent .  itself was first used in Nuova guida alla conversazione italiana, inglese e maltese.

The letter  had the most variations before being standardised in 1866. None of these are present in Unicode.  was first used in 1900, although the capital  was used earlier (in 1845), where its lower case counterpart was a dotted h.

Vassalli's 1796 work contained several new letters to represent the sounds of the Maltese language, which included the invention of several ad-hoc letters as well as the importation of Cyrillic ge, che, sha, and ze. His alphabet is set out in full with modern-day equivalents where known:

A, a = a

B, b = b

T, t = t

D, d = d

E, e = e

F, f = f

[V, or a Syriac/Arabic gimel open to the right] = g

[Ч], ɥ = ċ

H, h = h

ȣ

Ө, ө

Y, y = j

Г = ġ

З, з

U = ħ

I, i = i

J, j = j

K, k = k

[I with a small c superimposed on it]

L, l = l

M, m = m

N, n = n

O, o = o

P, p = p

R, r = r

S, s = s

Ɯ, ɯ = x

V, v = v

U, u = u

W, w = w

Z, z = z

Ʒ, ʒ = ż

Æ, æ = final e

Five grave accented vowels are also used to indicate which syllable should be stressed: Àà, Èè, Ìì, Òò, and Ùù.

Notes

References
 (it) Giovan Pietro Francesco Agius de Soldanis, Della lingua punica presentemente usata da maltesi, per Generoso Salomoni alla Piazza di S. Ignazio. Si vendono in Malta, 1750
 (it) Antonio Emanuele Caruana, Sull'origine della Lingua Maltese, Malta, Tipografia C. Busuttil, 1896
 (it) Giovanni Battista Falzon, Dizionario Maltese-Italiano-Inglese, G. Muscat, 1845 (1 ed.),  (2 ed.)
 (it) Giuseppe Nicola Letard, Nuova guida alla conversazione italiana, inglese e maltese ad uso delle scuole, Malta, 1866-75
 (it) Fortunato Panzavecchia, Grammatica della Lingua Maltese, M. Weiss, Malta, 1845 
 (it) Michele Antonio Vassalli, Grammatica della lingua Maltese, 2 ed., Malta, 1827 
 (it) Michele Antonio Vassalli, Lexicon Melitense-Latino-Italum, Roma, Fulgonius, 1796
 (it) Francesco Vella, Osservazioni sull'alfabeto maltese, 1840
 (it) Francesca Morando, Il-lingwa Maltija. Origine, storia, comparazione linguistica e aspetti morfologici, Prefazione di Joseph M. Brincat, Palermo, Edizioni La Zisa, 2017, ISBN 978-88-9911-339-1
 (en) S. Mamo, English-Maltese Dictionary, Malta, A. Aquilina, 1885 
 (en) A Short Grammar of the Maltese Language, Malta, 1845
 (en) C. F. Schlienz, Views on the Improvement of the Maltese Language, Malta, 1838 
 (en) Francesco Vella, Maltese Grammar for the Use of the English, Glaucus Masi, Leghorn, 1831
 (en) Francesco Vella, Dizionario portatile delle lingue Maltese Italiana, Inglese. pt. 1, Livorno, 1843
 (en) Joseph Aquilina, Teach Yourself Maltese, English University Press, 1965
 (en) Geoffrey Hull, The Malta Language Question: A Case Study in Cultural Imperialism, Said International, Valletta, 1993
 (mt) Vicenzo Busuttil, Diziunariu mill Inglis ghall Malti, 2 parts, N. C. Cortis & Sons, Malta, 1900

External links
 L-Użu tal-Malti fil-Kompjuter (manwal)

Latin alphabets
Maltese language
Semitic writing systems

arz:مالطى#الألف-به المالطى